Arsalan Nami (born May 21, 1984) better known as Arsi Nami, is a Swedish-Persian actor, music therapist, singer, songwriter, screenwriter and philanthropist living in Los Angeles, California. He earned himself the 14 Best Actor awards for his role of Dylan Steere in Aion, a film presented and sponsored by FujiFilm. The awards was given by the 2022 New York International Film Awards, Tokyo Film Awards, Chicago Indie Film Awards, Sweden Film Awards,  Cannes Silk Road Film Awards and Brazil Visions Film Fest to name a few, and his work in Aion was also selected and screened at the Academy of Motion Picture Arts and Sciences in Hollywood, California.   He won also won the Jury Prize award at the 2017 Cannes International Film Festival Entr'2 Marches for his leading role in motion picture Love is Blind, portraying the visually-impaired Italian American Giovanni.He Love is Blind also won an award for disability awareness and was screened at world famous Palais des Festival et des Congrès. Arsi Nami was also named as a Judge in the panel of the 2018, 2019 and 2020 Cannes Film Festival International Entr'2 Marches He was the lead actor in Children's Hospital Los Angeles production Healthcare in the Cloud, which premiered at the 2018 Society of Camera Operators Lifetime Achievement Awards, raising over $8 million for children's vision health. He portrayed as the manic depressed French-American painter named Vincent, in 2017 European Cinematography Award-winning drama motion picture Camelia.  He also received another international claim via his outstanding and comedic role as Cadiz in the  Just Cause 4 commercials for Square Enix, PlayStation and Xbox, as well as his lead role in the international hit music video "Hurt People" performed by international artists Aloe Blacc and Gryffin which reached over 1 million views on VEVO and YouTube.
Arsi Nami has also been a guest-star on the Steve Harvey show on NBCUniversal, as well as The Late Late Show with James Corden on CBS. His commercial acting credits include giant brands such as Google, PlayStation, BMW, Puma, MGM Grand, Mercedes-Benz, Prada, Facebook, Hewlett Packard,  KIA, Ford, Samsung, Disney, NBA and Guitar Center to name a few. He was also nominated for best lead male actor in the comedy film Villa, at 2017 Official Selection at Premio Tortoreto alla Cultura in Italy, AM Film Festival in Egypt and International Festival of Short Films on Culture & Tourism, India.

Arsi Nami's National TV breakthrough started when he was 17 years old, participating on Sikta Mot Stjärnorna (Aiming at the Stars), a national talent show program televised on TV4 (Sweden). organized by FremantleMedia (American Idol). After two auditions where 4000 participated, he became one of the 45 to enter the show acting and singing "Hero" (by Enrique Iglesias) live on national television, winning the second place award.

He won the Jury Prize for Best Short Screenplay for his screenplay Bachata at the 2021 New York Movie Awards, 2021. He won the Best Drama Short Screenplay award at 2021 Austin After Dark Film Festival  and at the 2021 CFIFF Changing Face International Film Festival in Australia.

His music credits include music written, sang and released on Fox TV shows Bones and The Goodwin Games  as well Cannes Film Festival Entr'2 Marches winning film Love is Blind  and Crown Prince of Heaven.

According to MTV.com, he is also listed as one of the few multilingual actors, musicians and music therapists outside of Shiraz.  He is also known to be the first Persian to introduce Music Therapy to the Persian population, where music is used to help increase quality of life for individuals with psychological and physical deficits. He is also being a philanthropist contributing to the special needs and disability communities through arts, film and music therapy.

Acting, TV and Commercials

Arsi Nami's National TV breakthrough started when he was 17 years old, participating on Sikta Mot Stjärnorna (Aiming at the Stars), a national talent show program televised on TV4 (Sweden). organized by FremantleMedia (American Idol). After two auditions where 4000 participated, he became one of the 45 to enter the show acting and singing "Hero" (by Enrique Iglesias) live on national television, winning the second place award.

His acting career blossomed through a silver lining leading to international awards at Film Festivals in Cannes, Los Angeles and Belgium. He took on the acting career after a car accident where he suffered from depression and pain. He attended acting workshops part of his rehabilitation. His passion for acting grew as he auditioned for the role of a blind man in motion picture Love is Blind, a population which he had been working for since he was 16 years old within healthcare and music therapy. Arsi Nami won the Jury Prize award at the 2017 Cannes International Film Festival Entr'2 Marches for his leading role in motion picture Love is Blind, portraying visually-impaired Italian-American Giovanni. Love is Blind also won an award for disability awareness and was screened at Palais des Festival et des Congrès. The film also received an official selection and nominated as the best short film at Hollywood Screening Film Festival and WE Care Film Festival in India, becoming a worldwide success for promoting disability awareness. Arsi Nami did also compose the Official film soundtrack for Love is Blind Arsi Nami was also named as a Judge at the 2018 Cannes Film Festival International Entr'2 Marches.

He earned himself the 14 Best Actor awards for his role of Dylan Steere in Aion, a film presented and sponsored by FujiFilm, about a single father whom with his ill son defies the unstoppable power of time through their relationship and love for each other. The awards was contributed by the 2022 New York International Film Awards, Tokyo Film Awards, Chicago Indie Film Awards, Sweden Film Awards,  Cannes Silk Road Film Awards and Brazil Visions Film Fest to name a few, and his work in Aion was also selected and screened at the Academy of Motion Picture Arts and Sciences in Hollywood, California.  Arsi Nami helped contribute to the disability community through film as he also starred as the lead actor in Children's Hospital Los Angeles production Healthcare in the Cloud, which raised over $8 million for children's vision health and pr. Healthcare in the Cloud premiered at 2018 Society of Camera Operators Lifetime Achievement Awards. With Arsi Nami's experience of working with population with mental health disorders, he took on the leading role of manic depressed French-American painter, Vincent, in motion picture Camelia, that won the 2017 European Cinematography Award.

He also received another international claim via his outstanding and comedic role as Cadiz in Just Cause 4 commercials for Square Enix PlayStation and Xbox, as well as his lead role in the international hit music video "Hurt People" performed by international artists Aloe Blacc and Gryffin which reached over 1 million views on VEVO and YouTube.

He portrayed as Randy Rigatoni, a Guinness World Record Judge in Oliver Tree's attempt to ride the biggest scooter in the world, with the video becoming top 6 trending videos on YouTube with over 1.2 million views within a day.

Arsi Nami has also been a guest-star on the Steve Harvey show on NBCUniversal, as well as The Late Late Show with James Corden on CBS.

He was also the lead actor in comedy film Villa, a 2017 Official Selection at Premio Tortoreto alla Cultura, Italy and International Festival of Short Films on Culture & Tourism, India. Arsi Nami also composed the soundtrack for Love is Blind as well as being the poster and art director.  His other outstanding and comedic international role was as Cadiz in Just Cause 4 commercials for Square Enix, PlayStation and Xbox. He also acted as the lead actor in comedy film Villa, an Official Selection in 2017 IFFC International Film Festival in India. Commercials include: Disney, Kia, BMW, TESLA, MGM GRAND, Cadillac, HP, Samsung, NBA, Vivo Phone China, Guitar Center, Independence Day Resurgence, Westin Hotels, Clorox, El Vato, Los Defensores etc.

Awards and nominations

Music
Arsi Nami's music has been featured on several TV Shows, films and video games.

His song "She Wants to Fly" (feat. Levi Whalen) was featured on Fox TV show Bones on May 12, 2014. The song was originally written for Freedom in Iran during the 2009 Presidential Elections and has previously been featured on the soundtrack of Cannes Film Festival movie Crown Prince of Heaven in 2010. It has also been broadcast on major TV networks around the world such as Peace Day Television show which has featured world figures Dalai Lama, Bono, U2, Brad Pitt, George Clooney, Angelina Jolie etc.

His dance-pop song "Never Be Lonely" (feat. Levi Whalen) was on June 3, 2013, featured on Fox TV show The Goodwin Games. "Never Be Lonely" is also featured as the dance track for the web video game Good Game Disco made by Goodgame Studios.

He also composed the Official Film Soundtrack for Love Is Blind, which won the Jury Prize at 2017 Cannes International Film Festival Entr'2 Marches, as well as being the Official Selection for the 2017 WE Care Film Festival, India and nominated as Best Short in 2017 Hollywood Screening Festival.

His song "Paradise" (feat. Levi Whalen) was on May 1, 2015, voted as #1 song at top 100 Indie Dance/Disco chart on Spinnin' Records Talent Pool. The song was also voted as number 1 song at March top 10 House dance chart on House Charts.com

His pop music with his cultural musical blend of Eurodance, World Rhythms and Electronica. Arsi Nami is also known for writing and performing his works for Freedom, Human Rights and Health foundations with all music & lyrics written by him. His music is multilingual, which includes songs released in English, Spanish, Italian and Swedish.

Arsi Nami joins Andrea Bocelli, The Beatles and Elvis Presley for releasing Consuelo Velázquez famous song "Bésame Mucho", via Shiraz Records, which makes it the first Duo/Latin house version in history, produced by Levi Whalen and co-sung with singer Jacqueline Padilla.

On April 21, 2013, Arsi Nami became the first artist to release his Pop Electronic and Progressive House rendition of world-famous Italian song "Caro Mio Ben" featuring UK based producer Kryphon. "Caro Mio Ben" was written by Italian composer Giuseppe Giordani, and made famous by Luciano Pavarotti. He is the executive producer of Caro Mio Ben music video which had world premiere on MTV.com on August 9, 2013. He has also co-directed, produced, and edited two of his music videos "100 Miles" and "Heaven Knows", which have been broadcast through mainstream medium giants such as MTV UK and featured at the Laemmie Theaters Santa Monica SMC Film Festival.

On January 14, 2012, Arsi Nami was signed by music publishing company Winogradsky/Sobel to have his music pitched for television, film and video games etc. becoming the first artist in the company representing Pop/Euro-Dance and World Music genre

Arsi Nami's single "Miracle" (feat Si Ana) released February 2012 via Royalty Recordings was featured for ten weeks on world's largest dance music store Beatport as Top Staff Pick in the pop/rock category. Arsi Nami's music is also listed on FairShareMusic, with profits going to human rights and health support organizations such as Red Cross, War Child, Nordoff-Robbins Music Therapy, Amnesty International, Cancer Care & Research etc.

Music therapy
According to MTV.com, Arsi Nami is also known for being the first Iranian to introduce music therapy to the Iranian population, where music is used to help increase quality of life for individuals with psychological and physical deficits. That includes his several TV appearances on giant Iranian media television stations such as IRAN TV, Radio 670am KIRN Los Angeles with journalist, author Homa Sarshar, Mardoom TV and TinTV and invitations to speak at UCLA. He has been awarded several scholarships and awards for his music therapy practice and accomplishments.  His recent awards include:The 2014 James R Simpson Merit Scholarship awarded by President Dianne Harrison of California State University, Northridge, The Royal Swedish Music Academy Award in 2013 and the Bayramian Art Scholarship Award in 2012 and 2013, for his music therapy studies and accomplishments.
Arsi Nami does also spend his time making motivational and guest speaking appearances. Speeches include Music Therapy, the positive influence of music on children and his music and cultural journey from Iran to Sweden to Los Angeles. His speeches also include leading instrumental music improvisation and therapeutic music instrumentation with the audience. Invitations include Stand Up to Cancer at UCLA, Music Entrepreneurship classes at California State University, Northridge, Music For Your Heart Foundation in Miami, Children's Boosh Foundation in Los Angeles, International Children Foundation in Santa Barbara, Cottage Health System in Santa Barbara and California State University, Channel Islands.

Arsi Nami is also the author of "The Effects of Music Therapy on Movement and Vocalization in Adult Male with Intellectual Disability and Cerebral Palsy: A Case Study and Treatment Plan", a clinical case study on how music therapy interventions on individuals with disabilities is so effective that it can help increase their speech and improve physical skills, which in turn can assist individuals with disabilities to communicate within their community more clearly and making their inclusion easier. He emphasizes on how vocalization aids in the development of functional communication skills, helping individuals with Intellectual Disabilities communicate their specific needs, wants, and discomforts within the community, which will help increase their personal independence and quality of life.

Guest appearances and performances

Music releases

Featured songs

Education
Arsi Nami graduated with honors on May 19, 2014, with a Bachelor of Arts degree in Music Therapy from California State University, Northridge.
He graduated with honors, Music A.A from Santa Monica College and a Music and Media Composing degree from ITM Sweden.

Philanthropy
Arsi Nami Co-Founded Non-Profit Organization Opportunitree to help the community, children, elderly and individuals with disabilities.
He spends a lot of time doing humanitarian work, raising awareness for human rights and health support organizations. He has been involved and contributed to charities such as:Red Cross, War Child, Nordoff-Robbins Music Therapy, Amnesty, WWF, British Heart Foundation, Cancer Research UK and ActionAid. He is also active bringing the importance of Music, Music Therapy to the community, children, elderly and individuals with disabilities. Arsi Nami's major contribution was by sharing disability awareness through of Drama film, Love Is Blind. Arsi Nami portrayed the lead blind actor as well as composing the official film soundtrack. The film was awarded the 2017 Jury Prize award at Cannes International Film Festival Entr'2 Marches, as well as official selection at WE Care Film Festival, India.

Arsi Nami's song She Wants To Fly was also written for Freedom and Human Rights in Iran, which has been featured at Peaceday TV and Cannes Film Festival motion picture Crown Prince of Heaven. He has also been a guest artist at Charities such as: Children's Boosh Foundation at Taglyan Place, Los Angeles, Music for your Heart Foundation in Miami, Stand Up 2 Cancer at UCLA, International Children Foundation in Santa Barbara to name a few.

His music is also listed on FairShareMusic, with profits going to human rights and health support organizations.

Books
Arsi Nami, the author of "The Effects of Music Therapy on Movement and Vocalization in Adult Male with Intellectual Disability and Cerebral Palsy: A Case Study and Treatment Plan", where he shows a clinical case study on how music therapy interventions on individuals with disabilities is so effective that it can help increase their speech and improve physical skills, which in turn can assist individuals with disabilities to communicate within their community more clearly and making their inclusion easier. He emphasizes on how vocalization aids in the development of functional communication skills. It also helps individuals with Intellectual Disabilities communicate their specific needs, wants, and wants, and discomforts within the community. Improving gross motor skills would help individuals to increase their personal independence, not only at the day care center but also in the community. In general, both vocalization and gross motors skill development helps to improve the self-help skills of individuals with disabilities, which in-turn increases quality of life. - Clinical Case Studies [22]

Basketball
As a teenager, Arsi Nami played as a Shooting guard (SG) in the team Brahe Basket in Sweden. He accomplished receiving 2 Most Valuable Player Awards as the best player in Jönköping during the 1995/1996 and 1996/1997 season and 1 Most Valuable Player Award as the best player of Southern Sweden during the Swedish Championship Basketball Competition in 1997/1998 season.

References

External links
 Official Page
 Instagram
 IMDb
 Fanpage
 Arsi Nami bio on The Corsair Santa Monica
 Arsi Nami on Google Play
 Arsi Nami on Amazon
 Arsi Nami on Google Books
 Arsi Nami on iTunes

1984 births
Living people
People from Shiraz
California State University, Northridge alumni
Swedish male actors
Swedish male singers
Swedish people of Iranian descent
Swedish pop singers
Swedish singer-songwriters
Iranian emigrants to Sweden
Iranian pop singers
Iranian male actors
Participants in Swedish reality television series
21st-century Swedish singers
21st-century Swedish male singers